I-371 was an Imperial Japanese Navy Type D1 transport submarine. Completed and commissioned in October 1944, she served in World War II and was sunk while returning from her first transport mission in February 1945.

Construction and commissioning

I-371 was laid down on 22 March 1944 by Mitsubishi at Kobe, Japan, with the name Submarine No. 5471. She was launched on 21 July 1944 and renamed I-371 that day. She was completed and commissioned on 2 October 1944.

Service history

Upon commissioning, I-371 was attached to the Sasebo Naval District and was assigned to Submarine Squadron 11 for workups. She was reassigned to Submarine Squadron 7 on 6 December 1944. During December 1944, she moved from the Seto Inland Sea to Yokosuka and began a 20-day period of workups from there.

Transport voyage
On 30 December 1944, I-371 departed Yokosuka bound for Truk and Mereyon Island at Woleai in the Caroline Islands on her first transport mission, carrying a cargo of 50 metric tons of food and mail, as well as aviation gasoline, spare parts, and ammunition for the Truk-based 171st Naval Air Group, which the aviators required to resume flights by Nakajima C6N1 Saiun ("Iridescent Cloud"; Allied reporting name "Myrt") reconnaissance aircraft over the American fleet anchorage at Ulithi Atoll. She arrived at Truk on 18 January 1945 and unloaded the portion of her cargo destined for Truk. During her stay, an Aichi E13A1 (Allied reporting name "Jake") floatplane arrived from Mereyon on 20 January 1945 with a coded message about I-371′s planned arrival there.

On 22 January 1945 I-371 got underway from Truk bound for Mereyon, which she reached at around 22:00 on 25 January 1945. She completed unloading her cargo at 03:00 on 26 January 1945 and headed back to Truk, where she arrived on 28 January 1945. She embarked some passengers and put back to sea, bound for Japan, with an estimated arrival date of 21 February 1945. She never arrived.

Loss

The circumstances of I-371′s loss are not clear. Her victim probably was I-371, although I-371 would have been running three days behind schedule to be in that location at that time. Other accounts credit the destroyer  with sinking I-371 off Okinawa on 23 March 1945, but that was 11 days after the Japanese had declared I-371 missing, and it is more likely that Haggard sank the submarine .

On 12 March 1945, the Imperial Japanese Navy declared  to be presumed lost in the vicinity of Truk along with all 84 crew and passengers on board. She was stricken from the Navy list on 10 April 1945.

Notes

Sources
 Hackett, Bob & Kingsepp, Sander.  IJN Submarine I-371: Tabular Record of Movement.  Retrieved on September 19, 2020.

Type D submarines
Ships built by Mitsubishi Heavy Industries
1944 ships
World War II submarines of Japan
Japanese submarines lost during World War II
Maritime incidents in February 1945
World War II shipwrecks in the Pacific Ocean
Submarines sunk by submarines
Ships sunk by American submarines